John IV of Saxe-Lauenburg (*?–1414*) was a son of Duke Eric IV of Saxe-Lauenburg and Sophia of Brunswick-Lüneburg.

Life
When Eric III of Saxe-Bergedorf-Mölln had died in 1401, John's father, Eric IV, inherited the branch duchy of the deceased. Subsequently, he shared the reign in the reunited duchy of Saxe-Lauenburg with John and his brother Eric V. However, most of Saxe-Bergedorf-Mölln had been alienated, such as the Herrschaft of Mölln (sold to Lübeck in 1359 under a repurchase agreement) and the Herrschaft of Bergedorf, the Vierlande, half the Saxon Wood and Geesthacht, all of which Eric III had pawned to the city of Lübeck in 1370.

Eric III had entitled Lübeck to take possession of these areas, once he had deceased, until his heirs would repay the credit and thus redeem them and simultaneously exercise their right to repurchase Mölln, requiring together a total sum of 26,000 Lübeck marks. In 1401 Eric IV, supported by his sons Eric V and John IV, forcefully captured the pawned areas without any repayment, before Lübeck could take possession of them. Lübeck acquiesced.

John had due debts with burghers of Hamburg. On a visit there under safe conduct granted by the Hamburg's senate (the city government), his creditor  (later in modern standard High German also: Hein Brand[t]) took the defaulting duke to task and dunned him in a way the duke considered insulting. The duke complained to the senate. The senate cited Brandes, who admitted the dunning, and arrested him. This caused a civic uproar of Hamburgers, electing from each of the then four parishes 12 representatives, the Council of the Forty-Eighters (die Achtundvierziger), who on Saint Lawrence Day (10 August) stipulated with the senate the Recess of 1410 (considered Hamburg's oldest constitutional act), denying the senate's privilege to arrest without a prior judicial hearing. The Forty-Eighters, in 1687 extended to the Council of the Sixty (die Sechziger), persisted and developed into the first permanent representation of the citizens of Hamburg, the nucleus of the Hamburg Parliament.

Their share in jurisdiction, Vogtei and castle had been acquired from the plague-stricken Knights of Bederkesa, who had dropped into decline after 1349/1350. Eric V ended his joint reign with John IV after their father Eric IV had deceased in 1412. After John IV died in 1414 without an heir.

Ancestry

Notes

|-

1414 deaths
Dukes of Saxe-Lauenburg
Year of birth unknown